The best known musician from the Occitan region of Limousin is probably the piper Eric Montbel, a former member of such  bands as Lo Jai, Le Grand Rouge, and Ulysse; he plays the chabreta, or Limousin bagpipe.  Along with him and other pipers, the region is known for Corrèze's distinct violin tradition as well as the hurdy-gurdy.  The fife is also popular

List of performers
Guy Bertrand
François Breugnot, violin
Jean Pierre Champeval, violin
Valentin Clastrier, hurdy-gurdy
Jean-Marc Delaunay, violin
Olivier Durif, violin
Françoise Etay, violin
Pierre Imbert
Jean-Yves Lameyre, violin, hurdy-gurdy
Myriam Lameyre, bagpipes
Pascal Lefeuvre, bagpipes
Christian Oller
Dominique Regef, hurdy-gurdy
Trio Violon, violin
Jean-François Vrod, violin

Limousin
Limousin